PCB is a free and open-source software suite for electronic design automation (EDA) - for printed circuit boards (PCB) layout. It uses GTK+ for its GUI widgets.

History
PCB was first written by Thomas Nau for an Atari ST in 1990 and ported to UNIX and X11 in 1994. Initially PCB was not intended to be a professional layout system but as a tool for individuals to do small-scale development of hardware.
The second release 1.2 introduced user menus. This made PCB easier to use and increased its popularity.
Harry Eaton took over PCB development beginning with Release 1.5, although he contributed some code from Release 1.4.3.

PCB includes a topological autorouter named Toporouter, developed by Anthony Blake in a Google-funded open source project mentored by DJ Delorie in 2008. It is mostly based on an implementation of the algorithms described in Tal Dayan's 1997 PhD thesis, "Rubberband based topological router". This router has meanwhile been adapted for use with the open-source KiCad project as well.

In 2013, pcb-rnd was forked from PCB.

Features
 Scalable fonts
 Layer groups to keep signals together
 Add on device drivers
 Gerber RS-274X and NC Drill output support
 Centroid (X-Y) data output
 PostScript and Encapsulated PostScript output
 Rats-nest generation from simple net lists
 Automatic clearance around pins that pierce a polygon
 Flags for pins and vias
 Groups of action commands can be undone by a single undo
 Simple design rule checker (DRC) - checks for minimum spacing and overlap rules
 Drawing directly on the silk layer
 Viewable solder-mask layers and editing
 Netlist window
 Netlist entry by drawing rats
 Auto router
 Snap to pins and pads
 Element files and libraries that can contain whole sub-layouts, metric grids
 Up to 16 copper layer designs by default
 Trace optimizer
 Rats nest
 Connectivity verification
 Can interoperate with free schematic capture tools such as gEDA and XCircuit
 GNU autoconf/automake based build system
 PCB is Free Software

See also 

 Comparison of EDA software
 List of free electronics circuit simulators

References

External links
 pcb.geda-project.org/pcb-cvs/pcb.html
 history of gEDA/PCB

Free electronic design automation software
Electronic design automation software for Linux
Electronic design automation software
Engineering software that uses GTK
Free software programmed in C